(born January 16, 1984 in Yokohama) is a Japanese freestyle skier, specializing in halfpipe.

Mitsuboshi competed at the 2014 Winter Olympics for Japan. She placed 23rd in the qualifying round in the halfpipe, failing to advance.

As of April 2014, her best showing at the World Championships is 4th, in the 2013 halfpipe.

Mitsuboshi made her World Cup debut in March 2006. As of April 2014, she has one World Cup podium finish, a silver medal at Cardrona in 2012–13. Her best World Cup overall finish in halfpipe is 6th, in the 2010–11.

World Cup Podiums

References

1984 births
Living people
Olympic freestyle skiers of Japan
Freestyle skiers at the 2014 Winter Olympics
People from Yokohama
Japanese female freestyle skiers
21st-century Japanese women